Theater Basel is the municipal theatre of the city of Basel, Switzerland, which is home to the city's opera and ballet companies. The theatre also presents  plays and musicals in addition to operas and operettas.

Because the theatre does not have its own orchestra, the Basel Symphony Orchestra is usually contracted to perform for opera and ballet productions as needed. For baroque-opera productions, La Cetra, the baroque orchestra of the Schola Cantorum Basiliensis, is engaged.

History

Theater Basel was founded in 1834 under the name Basler Stadttheater. The first theatre was designed by Swiss architect Melchior Berri.

In 1873 work on a new theatre began which was designed by Johann Jakob Stehlin Jr.. This second theatre opened in 1875 and was used until it was destroyed by fire on 7 October 1904.

Plans for a third theatre were soon made, but it was five years before the theatre finally opened in 1909.  The fourth theatre opened in 1975.

In October 2018, the company announced the appointment of Kristiina Poska as its next General Music Director (GMD; Generalmusikdirektorin), effective with the 2019–2020 season.

Intendants
 Leo Melitz (1899–1919)
 Ernst Lert (1919–1920)
 Otto Henning (1921–1925)
 Oskar Wälterlin (1925–1932)
 Egon Neudegg (1932–1949)
 Gottfried Becker, Kurt Horowitz, Hans Thudium (1949–1950; joint directors)
 Friedrich Schramm (1950–1953)
 Albert Wiesner (1953–1954)
 Hermann Wedekind (1954–1960)
 Werner Düggelin (1968–1975)
 Hans Hollmann (1975–1978)
 Horst Statkus (1978–1988)
 Frank Baumbauer (1988–1993)
 Wolfgang Zörner (1993–1994)
 Hans Peter Doll (1994–1996)
 Michael Schindhelm (1996–2006)
 Georges Delnon (2006–2015)
 Andreas Beck (2015–present)

References

Further reading

External links
 Official website

Basel
Theater Basel
Concert halls in Switzerland
Opera houses in Switzerland
Theatre Basel
Theatres completed in 1834
Theatres completed in 1875
Theatres completed in 1909
Theatres completed in 1975
Culture in Basel
Theatre Basel
19th-century architecture in Switzerland
20th-century architecture in Switzerland